Veppathur is a panchayat town in Thanjavur district in the Indian state of Tamil Nadu.

Veppathur was originally known as Nimmapuram (meaning "Neem Village" in Sanskrit). It is located approximately 5 km from Thiruvidaimaruthur and about 9 km from Kumbakonam.

The Economy of the village is mainly relayed on agriculture. Rice, Sugarcane, Cotton and green gram are cultivated in the fields around the village.

Demographics
 India census, Veppathur had a population of 7414. Males constitute 50% of the population and females 50%. Veppathur has an average literacy rate of 66%, higher than the national average of 59.5%: male literacy is 75%, and female literacy is 57%. In Veppathur, 11% of the population is under 6 years of age.

References

Cities and towns in Thanjavur district